Gunnar Gíslason (born 4 January 1961) is an Icelandic former footballer who played as a defender.

Club career
Gíslason started his career at KA Akureyri before moving abroad to play in Germany, Norway and Sweden, where he finished his career at BK Häcken.

International career
Gíslason made his debut for Iceland in 1982 and went on to collect 50 caps, scoring three goals. He played his last international match in a June 1991 European Championship qualifying match against Czechoslovakia.

References

External links
 

1961 births
Living people
Gunnar Gislason
Gunnar Gislason
VfL Osnabrück players
2. Bundesliga players
Gunnar Gislason
Moss FK players
BK Häcken players
Gunnar Gislason
Eliteserien players
Allsvenskan players
Gunnar Gislason
Gunnar Gislason
Association football defenders
Expatriate footballers in Norway
Expatriate footballers in Germany
Expatriate footballers in Sweden
Gunnar Gislason
Gunnar Gislason
Gunnar Gislason
Gunnar Gislason